USS Snook has been the name of more than one United States Navy ship, and may refer to:

 , a submarine commissioned in 1942 and lost in 1945
 , a submarine in commission from 1961 to 1986

United States Navy ship names